Jathedar Akali Surjit Singh  (1945–2014) was a Nihang and the 14th Jathedar of Budha Dal, after Akali Santa Singh. He was born on June 7, 1945, in Murar, Amritsar.

Early life
Before initiating to become a Singh of the Budha Dal, Surjit Singh had done service with Punjab Police forces. After finishing their service, they were initiated into the Dal in 1972 through the Khalsa ceremony of Amrit Sanchar. They stayed and did seva with the dal for nearly four decades, heading the Chakarvati Dal at some points during their time.

Jathedari Controversy
In 2005, Akali Santa Singh with their worsening health declared Jathedar Sahib as the next head of the Budha Dal (It is important to note that all major Jathebandis were present when Jathedar Baba Surjit Singh Ji was made next Jathedar but none of them were not present at Balbir's coronation). However, some Nihangs claim that another Singh of the Dal known as Balbir Singh (Jathedar to some) the nephew of Jathedar Santa Singh was chosen as the successor.

Subsequently, during the time, Baba Surjit Singh Ji was also arrested and kept in jail for a short period until their release in response to protests by Nihangs. This dispute had led to the many divisions in Budha Dal today with different factions claiming their own Jathedars.

Time in jail
After the death of Akali Santa Singh in 2008, the Dastarbandi ceremonies were conducted for both Surjit Singh and Balbir Singh by different factions of the dal. After this ceremony, Singh Sahib Jathedar Baba Surjit Singh ji received the title "Panth Patshah". In the following year, Jathedar Sahib along with 22 other Singhs of the Dal were arrested under false charges made by balbir and sentenced to be put in Patiala Jail under the authority of the corrupt Punjab Police. During their sentence, they had organized more than 40 Akhand Paaths in jail. At many instances such as in 2011, Baba Ji fell ill due to the unhygienic conditions in jail.

On September 3, 2014, Jathedar Sahib passed away at the age of 69 and their Antim Sanskar were performed at a Gurdwara Sahib near Bathinda. Before his death, Baba Ji had chosen Akali Joginder Singh as the next Jathedar. However, they were in UK at the moment so Akali Prem Singh was chosen as his successor to be the next Jathedar of Shiromani Panth Akali Budha Dal despite the wishes of Baba Ji. This decision further led the Dal into 3 factions.

References

Nihang
Sikhism
1945 births
2014 deaths